The Adventures of Maddog Williams in the Dungeons of Duridian is a 1992 video game developed by Game Crafter. The game is a cross between a text adventure and a role-playing game in which the player assumes the role of Maddog Williams, a shopkeeper and inventor from the seaside town of Marinor.

Maddog Williams was released on Amiga, Atari ST and DOS and a sequel was planned for release titled Escape from Cylindria. Currently the game is freely available for download from the developers' website.

Gameplay
Players control the eponymous Maddog Williams and must guide him through eight quests. The quest begins in Maddog's home; the player is able to explore before gradually finding clues on how to progress further due to the relatively non-linear nature of the game compared to other adventures. The game's environments house objects to manipulate and non-player characters to converse with for information, as well as enemies who can be vanquished through combat.

References

External links

Game Crafters homepage

1992 video games
Adventure games
Amiga games
Atari ST games
DOS games
Video games developed in the United States